Navid Kermani (born 27 November 1967 in Siegen, Germany) is a German writer and orientalist. He is the author of several novels as well as books and essays on Islam, the Middle East and Christian-Muslim dialogue. He has won numerous prizes for his literary and academic work, including the Peace Prize of the German Publishers' Association on 18 June 2015.

Life
Navid Kermani was born the fourth son of Iranian parents in Siegen, West Germany. He began his writing career  at age 15 as a local reporter for the Westfälische Rundschau. As a student he published in German national newspapers; from 1996 to 2000 he was a regular contributor to the cultural section of Frankfurter Allgemeine Zeitung. He studied philosophy, Oriental studies and drama in Cologne, Cairo and Bonn. His doctoral thesis has been published in English translation as God Is Beautiful: The Aesthetic Experience of the Quran.

He regularly publishes articles, literary reviews and travelogues, especially in Süddeutsche Zeitung, Die Zeit, Neue Zürcher Zeitung and Der Spiegel.

In the preface of his book Between Quran and Kafka: West-Eastern Affinities he acknowledges that he is an Orientalist and his world view has been shaped by his childhood interactions living in a German society.

Bibliography

 Offenbarung als Kommunikation: Das Konzept wahy in Nasr Hamid Abu Zaids Mafhum an-nass, Frankfurt et al. 1996 (Peter Lang).
 Gott ist schön: Das ästhetische Erleben des Koran, Munich 1999: C. H. Beck.
 Nasr Hamid Abu Zaid: Ein Leben mit dem Islam, Freiburg 1999: Herder.
 Iran: Die Revolution der Kinder, Munich 2000: C. H. Beck.
 Dynamit des Geistes: Martyrium, Islam und Nihilismus, Göttingen 2002: Wallstein.
 Das Buch der von Neil Young Getöteten, Zurich 2002: Ammann: Cologne 2004; Kiepenheuer; Berlin 2013: Suhrkamp.
 Schöner Neuer Orient: Berichte von Städten und Kriegen, Munich 2003: C. H. Beck; Munich 2007: dtv.
 Toleranz: Drei Lesarten zu Lessings Märchen vom Ring im Jahre 2003 (with Angelika Overath and Robert Schindel), Göttingen 2003: Wallstein.
 Vierzig Leben, Zurich 2004: Ammann.
 Du sollst, Zurich 2005: Ammann.
 Der Schrecken Gottes Munich 2005: C. H. Beck.
 Strategie der Eskalation: Der Nahe Osten und die Politik des Westens, Göttingen 2005: Wallstein.
 Nach Europa, Zurich 2006: Ammann.
 Ayda, Bär und Hase, Vienna 2006: Picus.
 Mehdi Bazargan, Und Jesus ist sein Prophet: Der Koran und die Christen, German trans. from the Persian by Markus Gerhold, ed. and with an introduction by Navid Kermani, Munich 2006: C. H. Beck.
 Kurzmitteilung, Zurich 2007: Ammann.
 Wer ist Wir? Deutschland und seine Muslime, Munich 2009: C. H. Beck.
 Ausnahmezustände: Reisen in eine beunruhigte Welt, Munich 2013: C. H. Beck.
 Zwischen Koran und Kafka: West-östliche Erkundungen, Munich 2014: C. H. Beck.
 Ungläubiges Staunen: Über das Christentum, Munich 2015: C. H. Beck.
 Sozusagen Paris, Munich 2016: Hanser.
 Einbruch der Wirklichkeit: Auf dem Flüchtlingstreck durch Europa, Munich 2016: C. H. Beck.
 Entlang den Gräben: Eine Reise durch das östliche Europa bis nach Isfahan, Munich 2018: C. H. Beck.
 Morgen ist da: Reden, Munich 2019: C. H. Beck.
 Jeder soll von da, wo er ist, einen Schritt näher kommen: Fragen nach Gott, Munich 2022: Hanser.

In English translation
 

 
 
 (2018 Schlegel-Tieck Prize.)

Awards and distinctions
 2009: Hessian Cultural Prize
 2011: Buber-Rosenzweig-Medal
 2011: Hannah Arendt Prize
 2012: Kleist Prize
 2012: Cicero Prize for public speaking
 2014: Joseph Breitbach Prize
 2015: Member of the North Rhine-Westphalian Academy of Sciences, Humanities and the Arts
 2015: Peace Prize of the German Publishers' Association
2015: Jan Michalski Prize for Literature finalist for Zwischen Koran und Kafka: West-östliche Erkundungen
2020: Friedrich-Hölderlin-Preis

Other activities
 Avicenna-Studienwerk, Member of the Board of Trustees
 Goethe Institute, Member of the Committee for the Goethe Medal
 Green Helmets, Member of the Board of Trustees

Controversy
In 2009, the German state of Hesse decided to award its 45,000 euro Hessian Cultural Prize in July 2009 jointly to a Jew, a Muslim, a Catholic and a Lutheran to honour those involved in interfaith dialogue. There was controversy over Kermani's nomination as one of the three winners because of an essay in which Kermani had written about his feelings on seeing a painting of the crucifixion by the seventeenth-century Italian painter Guido Reni.  The issue was ultimately resolved, and Cardinal Karl Lehmann, Kermani, and Salomon Korn jointly received the prize on 26 November 2009. Kermani donated his share of the award to a Christian priest.

Personal life
Kermani holds German and Iranian citizenship. He has two children with the Islam scholar Katajun Amirpur, from whom he was divorced in 2020. He lives in Cologne.

References

External links
 
 
 

1967 births
Living people
German people of Iranian descent
German Muslims
21st-century Muslim scholars of Islam
Academic staff of the University of Bonn
People from Siegen
Islam-related controversies in Europe
German Shia Muslims
German male writers
German scholars of Islam